The Miss Maine competition is the pageant that selects the representative for the state of Maine in the Miss America pageant. Maine has been represented in the pageant since 1937, although the state has never produced a winner.

With Alaska became the latest state crowned the Miss America title, Maine is one of the few states along with South Dakota, West Virginia and Wyoming that has yet to win a Miss America, Miss USA, or Miss Teen USA title.

Madison Leslie of Lewiston was crowned Miss Maine 2022 on June 18, 2022, at Freeport Performing Arts Center in Freeport. She competed for the title of Miss America 2023 at the Mohegan Sun in Uncasville, Connecticut in December 2022.

Results summary
The following is a visual summary of the past results of Miss Maine titleholders at the national Miss America pageants/competitions. The year in parentheses indicates the year of the national competition during which a placement and/or award was garnered, not the year attached to the contestant's state title.

Placements
 2nd runners-up: Karen Johanna Johnson (1971)
 4th runners-up: Allyn Warner (1972)
 Top 18: Iva Stewart (1933)

Awards

Preliminary awards
 Preliminary Talent: Allyn Warner (1972)

Non-finalist awards
 Non-finalist Talent: Sally Ann Robinson (1961), Dawn Frances Christie (1962), Marilyn Lash (1973), Laurie Wathen (1988), Elizabeth Edgecomb (2004), Ami Vice (2005), Susie Stauble (2010), Kristin Korda (2014)

Other awards
 Bernie Wayne Scholarship: Ami Vice (2005)
 Miss Congeniality: Mariah Larocque (2022)

Winners

Controversies
In 2015, pageant contestant Marisa Butler attracted controversy for her volunteer role catching and tagging sharks with the National Oceanic and Atmospheric Administration. Butler was staging bikini shot pictures after dragging sharks onto the beach to be tagged - a practice considered by experts to be harmful. Butler responded to the criticism on Facebook, writing: “I am working towards spreading awareness and changing public opinion about sharks.”

References

External links
 Official website

Maine culture
Maine
Women in Maine
Recurring events established in 1923
1923 establishments in Maine